Carlos Miguel Ribeiro Dias (born 26 February 1993), known as Cafú, is a Portuguese professional footballer who plays for Premier League club Nottingham Forest as a midfielder.

He played in Portugal, France, Poland, Greece and England, winning two Ekstraklasa and Super League Greece titles with Legia Warsaw and Olympiacos respectively, as well as a double with both of those teams.

Club career

Benfica
Born in Guimarães of Bissau-Guinean descent, Cafú joined local Vitória SC's youth system at the age of 11, signing with S.L. Benfica four years later and going on to complete his development there. He started playing as a striker, but later shifted to a defensive midfielder role.

On 19 September 2012, whilst with Benfica B, Cafú made his debut as a professional, coming on as a 46th-minute substitute for Cláudio Correa and scoring the 2–2 equaliser away against C.D. Tondela in the Segunda Liga. It was his only goal of the season, in seven starts.

Guimarães
On 26 July 2013, Cafú signed a four-year contract with former club Vitória. Having returned to his previous position, he was initially assigned to the reserve team, which he helped promote to the second tier.

Cafú first appeared in the Primeira Liga on 17 August 2014, in a 3–1 away win over Gil Vicente F.C. where he partnered André André and Bernard Mensah in midfield and also featured the full 90 minutes. He finished his debut campaign with 29 games, in an eventual fifth-place finish and the subsequent qualification to the UEFA Europa League.

Lorient
On 8 June 2016, Cafú signed a four-year contract with French club FC Lorient. His maiden appearance in Ligue 1 occurred on 18 November, in a 3–0 home loss against AS Monaco FC.

Metz
Following his team's relegation, Cafú joined FC Metz also in the French top division on 1 August 2017, penning a three-year deal for an undisclosed fee. He made his league debut 17 days later, playing the full 90 minutes in a 1–0 home defeat to title holders Monaco.

Legia Warsaw
On 27 February 2018, Cafú was loaned to Legia Warsaw until 30 June 2019. Subsequently, the move was made permanent.

During his spell at the Polish Army Stadium, Cafú took part in 59 competitive matches (nine goals, six assists). On 2 May 2018, he scored the 2–1 winner in the final of the Polish Cup against Arka Gdynia.

Olympiacos
On 1 February 2020, Olympiacos F.C. agreed to pay Legia €400,000 to sign Cafú. He played 14 official games during his stint, including nine in two separate editions of the Super League Greece which his team won.

Nottingham Forest
Cafú was loaned to English Championship side Nottingham Forest on 5 October 2020, until the end of the season. He was originally seen as a defensive midfielder, but manager Chris Hughton began using him in a more attacking role.

Cafú agreed to a permanent move on 2 February 2021. He scored his first goal for the club on 11 December, closing a 4–1 away win against Swansea City. The following 9 January, he came off the bench for Philip Zinckernagel to help beat Arsenal 1–0 in the third round of the FA Cup. He was unused as the Reds ended their 23-year absence from the Premier League with a 1–0 playoff final victory over Huddersfield Town on 29 May 2022.

On 14 August 2022, Cafú made his debut in the English top tier, replacing Orel Mangala late into the 1–0 home defeat of West Ham United.

International career
Cafú earned 27 caps for Portugal, from the under-16 to the under-20 levels. He was part of the under-19 squad that competed in the 2012 UEFA European Championship.

Career statistics

Club

Honours
Legia Warsaw
Ekstraklasa: 2017–18, 2019–20
Polish Cup: 2017–18

Olympiacos
Super League Greece: 2019–20, 2020–21
Greek Football Cup: 2019–20

Nottingham Forest
EFL Championship play-offs: 2022

References

External links

1993 births
Living people
Portuguese sportspeople of Bissau-Guinean descent
Sportspeople from Guimarães
Black Portuguese sportspeople
Portuguese footballers
Association football midfielders
Primeira Liga players
Liga Portugal 2 players
Campeonato de Portugal (league) players
S.L. Benfica B players
Vitória S.C. B players
Vitória S.C. players
Ligue 1 players
FC Lorient players
FC Metz players
Ekstraklasa players
Legia Warsaw players
Super League Greece players
Olympiacos F.C. players
Premier League players
English Football League players
Nottingham Forest F.C. players
Portugal youth international footballers
Portuguese expatriate footballers
Expatriate footballers in France
Expatriate footballers in Poland
Expatriate footballers in Greece
Expatriate footballers in England
Portuguese expatriate sportspeople in France
Portuguese expatriate sportspeople in Poland
Portuguese expatriate sportspeople in Greece
Portuguese expatriate sportspeople in England